The Hub, also known as 333 Schermerhorn Street, is a 610-foot, 55-floor skyscraper in the Downtown Brooklyn neighborhood of Brooklyn, New York City. The building contains 754 apartments, four high-rise elevators and three mid-rise elevators.

The Hub was the tallest building in Brooklyn when it topped out in December 2015, passing previous record-holder, AVA DoBro, until it was passed in turn by Brooklyn Point, within the City Point complex, in April 2019.

Gallery

See also
List of tallest buildings in Brooklyn
List of tallest buildings in New York City

References

External links

The Hub on Dattner Architects
The Hub on CTBUH
The Hub on Emporis
The Hub on Skyscraperpage.com

Residential skyscrapers in New York City
2010s architecture in the United States
2016 establishments in New York City
Postmodern architecture in New York City
Downtown Brooklyn
Residential buildings in Brooklyn
Skyscrapers in Brooklyn
Residential buildings completed in 2016